The 2012–13 Danish Superliga season was the 23rd season of the Danish Superliga, which decided the Danish football championship. It marked the 100 year anniversary of the first ever Danish Football Championship, held in 1912–13.

The season began on 13 July 2012 and ended on 20 May 2013.

Teams
Lyngby Boldklub and HB Køge finished the 2011–12 season in 11th and 12th place, respectively, and were relegated to the 2012–13 1st Division.

The relegated teams were replaced by 2011–12 1st Division champions Esbjerg fB and runners-up Randers FC.

Stadia and locations

Personnel and sponsoring
Note: Flags indicate national team as has been defined under FIFA eligibility rules. Players and Managers may hold more than one non-FIFA nationality.

Managerial changes

League table

Positions by round

Results

Matchday 1–11

Matchday 12–33

Top goalscorers

References

Danish Superliga seasons
1
Denmark